William Henry Hubert (January 19, 1913 – May 19, 2000), nicknamed "Bubber", was an American Negro league pitcher between 1939 and 1946.

A native of Ocala, Florida, Hubert made his Negro leagues debut in 1939 with the Newark Eagles. In 1940, he and Ross Davis tossed a combined no-hitter for the Baltimore Elite Giants against Newark. In 1944, Hubert played for the Homestead Grays during the team's 1944 Negro World Series championship season. After his Negro leagues career, he played minor league baseball for the Farnham Pirates of the Provincial League in 1948. Hubert died in Bronx, New York in 2000 at age 87.

References

External links
 and Seamheads

1913 births
2000 deaths
Baltimore Elite Giants players
Cincinnati/Cleveland Buckeyes players
Cleveland Buckeyes players
Homestead Grays players
Newark Eagles players
Philadelphia Stars players
20th-century African-American sportspeople
Baseball pitchers